The Man Who Understood Women is a 1959 American drama film written and directed by Nunnally Johnson from a novel by Romain Gary, and starring Henry Fonda, Leslie Caron, Renate Hoy and Cesare Danova.

Plot 
Willie Bauche, a Hollywood producer, becomes so obsessed with turning his wife, Ann Garantier, into the sexiest star in Hollywood that he neglects her real needs. Feeling lonely and tired of Tinseltown, Ann returns to her native France and finds herself attracted to Marco Ranieri, a handsome and very attentive pilot. When Willie hears about the budding affair, he flies into a rage and hires assassins to kill his rival. Unfortunately for him, one of the killers is a romantic and decides that Ann and Marco are so in love that both must die so they can always be together. When Willie finds out, he rushes over to France to try to save his wife.

Cast 
 Henry Fonda as Bauche
 Leslie Caron as Ann
 Cesare Danova as Marco
 Conrad Nagel as Brody
 Myron McCormick as the Preacher

See also
 List of American films of 1959

References

External links 
 
 

1959 films
1959 drama films
20th Century Fox films
CinemaScope films
American drama films
Films based on French novels
Films based on works by Romain Gary
Films directed by Nunnally Johnson
Films scored by Robert Emmett Dolan
Films set in France
Films set on the French Riviera
Films with screenplays by Nunnally Johnson
1950s English-language films
1950s American films